This is a list of rivers wholly or partly in Pakistan, organised geographically by river basin, from west to east.  Tributaries are listed from the mouth to the source. The longest and the largest river in Pakistan is the Indus River. Around two-thirds of water supplied for irrigation and in homes come from the Indus and its associated rivers.

Flowing into the Arabian Sea
Some of these rivers flow only during the rainy season, so for part of the year the water may or may not reach the sea.

Dasht River (Urdu: دریائے دشت)
Kech River
Basol River 
Hingol River (Urdu: دریائے ہنگول) 
Nal River
Porali River
Hub River (Urdu: دریائے حب) 
Orangi Nala
Malir River (Urdu:دریائے ملير ) 
Lyari River (Urdu:لیاری ندی)(no more river only drain now)
Gujjar Nala(no more river only drain now)

Indus River basin 

Indus River
Panjnad River (Urdu: پنجند)
Chenab River 
Ravi River
Jhelum River 
Poonch River 
Kunhar River 
Neelum River or Kishanganga
Tawi River 
Manawar Tawi River
Sutlej River
Gomal River 
Kundar River 
Zhob River
Kurrum River (Urdu: دریائے کرم )
Tochi River, sometimes referred to as the Gambila River 
Soan River (Urdu: دریائے سون)
Ling stream
Haro River
Kabul River
Swat River
River Jindi
Panjkora River
Bara River
Kunar River (Kunar Rud)
Lutkho River
Siran River
Tangir River:
Tributary river of River Indus; flows from Tangir Valley District Diamer down to the river Indus with Karakuram Highway.
Astore River
Rupal River, rising from the melt water of the Rupal Glacier
Gilgit River
Hunza River
Naltar River
Hispar River
Shimshal River
Chapursan River
Misgar River
Khunjerab River
Ishkuman River
Yasin River
Satpara Stream
Shigar River (Urdu: دریائے شگر ), formed from the melting water of the Baltoro Glacier and Biafo Glacier.
Braldu River 
Shyok River
Saltoro River
Hushe River
Nubra River, rising from the meltwater of the Siachen Glacier 
Suru River
Dras River
Shingo River

Flowing into endorheic basins

Hamun-i-Mashkel 
Mashkel River
Rakshan River

Sistan Basin 
Helmand River (Iran/Afghanistan)
Arghandab River (Afghanistan)
Lora River or Dori River

Indus Plains 
Nari River
Mula River
Bolan River
Beji River
Anambar River
Loralai River
Loe Manda River

Thar Desert 
Ghaggar River

Tarim Basin
Tarim River (China)
Yarkand River (China)
Shaksgam River

Ancient rivers 
Ghaggar-Hakra River: An intermittent river in India and Pakistan that flows only  during the monsoon season. While it is often identified with the Sarasvati River, this is not a consensus view. The Hakra is the dried-out channel of a river in Pakistan that is the continuation of the Ghaggar River in India. Several times, but not continuously, it carried the water of the Sutlej during the Bronze Age period  Many settlements of the Indus Valley civilisation have been found along the Ghaggar and Hakra rivers.
Saraswati River: Also known as Sarasvati River. This river was one of the major rivers of Ancient India which no longer exists.

References

External links
 Rivers of Pakistan by 
International Rivers website

Pakistan
Rivers